Wasan Mala is a Thai footballer who plays as a defensive-midfielder. Mala played five times for Air Force Central in Thai League 1 during the 2018 season.

References

External links

Living people
1999 births
Wasan Mala
Wasan Mala
Wasan Mala
Wasan Mala
Association football midfielders